Schistura bolavenensis is a species of ray-finned fish in the stone leach genus Schistura. It is found in the Bolaven Plateau in Laos where it occurs in clear rocky streams at altitudes of  800–1,200 m which form tributaries of the Xe Kong and Xe Don rivers were it feeds on insects. It is threatened by proposals to construct dams and from the mining of bauxite on the Bolovan Plateau.

References 

B
Fish described in 2000